Quebec nationalism or Québécois nationalism is a feeling and a political doctrine that prioritizes cultural belonging to, the defence of the interests of, and the recognition of the political legitimacy of the Québécois nation. It has been a movement and a central issue in Quebec politics since the beginning of the 19th century. Québécois nationalism has seen several political, ideological and partisan variations and incarnations over the years.

Quebec nationalism plays a central role in the political movement for the independence of Quebec from Canada. Several groups and political parties claim to be Québécois nationalists. The autonomist political parties, which do not want the sovereignty of Quebec but the expansion of its powers and the defence of its specificity within Canada, such as the Coalition Avenir Québec, also claim to be Québécois nationalists.

Quebec nationalism was first known as "French Canadian nationalism". The term was replaced by "Québécois nationalism" during the Quiet Revolution.

Canadien liberal nationalism

New France 
The settlement of New France was made up of 7 regions that spanned from the Maritimes to the Rockies and from the Hudson Bay to the Gulf of Mexico. Although this landscape was vast, most efforts were made to colonize what is now present-day Canada. After the 17th century, the newly-arrived French settlers adapted to the terrain of New France. Over time, these settlers developed a regional Canadian identity. This could be seen in the developing of new accents, creation of new legends and stories, emerging societal traits and the use of the French language. The latter originated with the loss of the settlers' langue d'oïls and the adoption of standard French, which came to be used by the educated classes of the colony. It further developed from the levelling of many langues d'oïl which led to the creation of a local accent.

During this time, the newly-arrived immigrants were no longer seen as immigrants but rather people who embodied not only a Canadian identity but also a provincial identity as well. Moreover, this was complemented by the fact that 95% of the colonists were Francophones, while the remaining people were English-speaking. However, this would prove to create contention later on.

1534–1774

Canada was first a French colony. Jacques Cartier claimed it for France in 1534, and permanent French settlement began in 1608. It was part of New France, which constituted all French colonies in North America. Up until 1760,  nationalism had developed itself free of all external influences. However, during the Seven Years' War, the British invaded New France as part of the French and Indian War, winning a conclusive victory at the Battle of the Plains of Abraham. At the Treaty of Paris, France agreed to abandon its claims over New France in return for the island of Guadeloupe. From the 1760s onward,  nationalism developed within a British constitutional context. Despite intense pressure from outside Parliament, the British government drafted the Quebec Act which guaranteed  the restoration of French civil law; guaranteed the free practice of the Catholic faith; and returned the territorial extensions that they had enjoyed before the Treaty of Paris. In effect, this "enlightened" action by leaders in the British Parliament allowed French Canada to retain its unique characteristics. Although detrimental to Britain's relationship with the Thirteen Colonies, this has, in its contemporary assessment, been viewed as an act of appeasement and was largely effective at dissolving  nationalism in the 18th century (especially considering the threat and proximity of American revolutionary ideology) yet it became less effective with the arrival of Loyalists after the revolutions. With the Loyalists splitting the Province of Quebec into two identities; Upper Canada and Lower Canada,  were labelled by the Loyalists as French Canadians.

1800s–1880s

From 1776 to the late 1830s, the world witnessed the creation of many new national states with the birth of the United States, the French Republic, Haiti, Paraguay, Argentina, Chile, Mexico, Brazil, Peru, Gran Colombia, Belgium, Greece and others. Often accomplished militarily, these national independence movements occurred in the context of complex ideological and political struggles pitting European metropoles against their respective colonies, often assuming the dichotomy of monarchists against republicans. These battles succeeded in creating independent republican states in some regions of the world, but they failed in other places, such as Ireland, Upper Canada, Lower Canada, and Germany.

There is no consensus on the exact time of the birth of a national consciousness in French Canada. Some historians defend the thesis that it existed before the 19th century, because the Canadiens saw themselves as a people culturally distinct from the French even in the time of New France. The cultural tensions were indeed palpable between the governor of New France, the Canadian-born Pierre de Vaudreuil and the General Louis-Joseph de Montcalm, a Frenchman, during the French and Indian War. However, the use of the expression la nation canadienne (the Canadian nation) by French Canadians is a reality of the 19th century. The idea of a nation canadienne was supported by the liberal or professional class in Lower Canada: lawyers, notaries, librarians, accountants, doctors, journalists, and architects, among others.

A political movement for the independence of the Canadien people slowly took form following the enactment of the Constitutional Act of 1791. The Act of the British Parliament created two colonies, Lower Canada and Upper Canada, each of which had its own political institutions. In Lower Canada, the French-speaking and Catholic Canadiens held the majority in the elected house of representatives, but were either a small minority or simply not represented in the appointed legislative and executive councils, both appointed by the Governor, representing the British Crown in the colony. Most of the members of the legislative council and the executive council were part of the British ruling class, composed of wealthy merchants, judges, militia officers and other members of the elite supportive of the Tory party. From early 1800 to 1837, the government and the elected assembly were at odds on virtually every issue.

Under the leadership of Speaker Louis-Joseph Papineau, the Parti canadien (renamed Parti patriote in 1826) initiated a movement of reform of the political institutions of Lower Canada. The party's constitutional policy, summed up in the Ninety-Two Resolutions of 1834, called for the election of the legislative and executive councils.

The movement of reform gathered the support of the majority of the representatives of the people among Francophones but also among liberal Anglophones. A number of the prominent characters in the reformist movement were of British descent, for example John Neilson, Wolfred Nelson, Robert Nelson and Thomas Storrow Brown or of Irish extraction, Edmund Bailey O'Callaghan, Daniel Tracey and Jocquelin Waller.

Two currents existed within the reformists of the Parti canadien: a moderate wing, whose members were fond of British institutions and wished for Lower Canada to have a government more accountable to the elective house's representative and a more radical wing whose attachment to British institutions was rather conditional to this proving to be as good as to those of the neighbouring American republics.

The formal rejection of all 92 resolutions by the Parliament of Great Britain in 1837 led to a radicalization of the patriotic movement's actions. Louis-Joseph Papineau took the leadership of a new strategy which included the boycott of all British imports. During the summer, many popular gatherings (assemblées populaires) were organized to protest against the policy of Great Britain in Lower Canada. In November, Governor Archibald Acheson ordered the arrest of 26 leaders of the patriote movement, among whom Louis-Joseph Papineau and many other reformists were members of parliament. This instigated an armed conflict which developed into the Lower Canada Rebellion.

Following the repression of the insurrectionist movement of 1838, many of the most revolutionary nationalist and democratic ideas of the Parti patriote were discredited.

Ultramontane nationalism

1840s–1950s

Although it was still defended and promoted up until the beginning of the 20th century, the French-Canadian liberal nationalism born out of the American and French revolutions began to decline in the 1840s, gradually being replaced by both a more moderate liberal nationalism and the ultramontanism of the powerful Catholic clergy as epitomized by Lionel Groulx.

In opposition with the other nationalists, ultramontanes rejected the rising democratic ideal that the people are sovereign and that the Church should have limited influence in governance.  To protect the power of the Church and prevent the rise of democracy and the separation of church-and-state, Lionel Groulx and other intellectuals engaged in nationalistic 'myth-making' or propaganda, to build a nationalistic French-Canadian identity, in purpose to protect the power of the Church and dissuade the public from popular-rule and secularist views.  Groulx propagated French-Canadian nationalism and argued that maintaining a Roman Catholic Quebec was the only means to 'emancipate the nation against English power.'  He believed the powers of the provincial government of Quebec could and should be used within Confederation, to bolster provincial autonomy (and thus Church power), and advocated it would benefit the French-Canadian nation economically, socially, culturally and linguistically.  Groulx successfully promoted Québécois nationalism and the ultra-conservative Catholic social doctrine, to which the Church would maintain dominance in political and social life in Quebec.  In the 1920s–1950s, this form of traditionalist Catholic nationalism became known as clerico-nationalism.

1950s 
In the time leading up to the radical changes of the Quiet Revolution the people of Quebec placed more importance on traditional values in life which included going back to their nationalistic roots.

Nationalism at this time meant restoring the old regime and going back to the concept of a French-Canadian nation built upon Catholicism as it was in the past. The church and state were intertwined and the church greatly dictated legislature falling under the matters of the state.

Nationalism also represented conservation, and in that, not being influenced by the outside world but rather staying within their own borders without room for exploration. Quebec was very closed minded wanting to keep their people and province untouched by the more progressive ideas from the rest of the world. Even in terms of careers, the church governed the state in this aspect and people were working conventional jobs such as in the agricultural industry.

Quebec did not align with the fast-paced urban life of Western society that was reflected across the nation and other countries. The lack of great progression is believed to be attributed to the premier of the province at this time Maurice Duplessis.

Maurice Duplessis returned to win the 1944 election and stayed in the position of premier of Quebec for fifteen years whilst being the leader of the conservative Union Nationale party. The Union Nationale party valued and upheld the traditional definition of nationalism. This meant the province would upkeep its long-established ways of operating with changes being made only within the scope of the conventional values. Because of this, the Union Nationale party was favored by those who wanted to stick to the accustomed lifestyle and disliked by those who wanted a progressive province being brought into the North American culture.

Duplessis's main ideas to transform Quebec were through rapid industrialization, urbanization and a greater and faster development of the province's natural resources. English speakers of the province hoped that industrialization and urbanization would replace the outdated French Canadian society. These changes launched French Canadians into the urban and industrial way of life. There were new opportunities created to provide economic and social stability but by doing so, decreased the importance and significance placed upon cultural and linguistic survival.

However, the deaths of Maurice Duplessis in September 1959 and his successor Paul Sauve in January 1960 set in motion the final end to the old traditional definition of Quebec nationalism in the 1950s. A new leader, Quebec and ideology of nationalism would emerge and sweep across the province finally providing French-Canadians their greatly awaited need for change.

1960s 
The events leading up to the 1960s were catalysts that would tear down and reconstruct the foundation of what it meant to be a Quebec Nationalist.

Nationalism in the 1960s represented a completely new mantra unlike the aged significance placed upon it in the 1950s. The 1960s in Quebec was a period of the Quiet Revolution, the Liberal Party of Canada the election of the Parti Québécois, a site of a thriving economy and the beginning of a variety of independent movements. During this time, Quebec was a place of enlightenment, there were changes in the society, values, and economy. This was a time of radical thinking, culture and ideologies, one ideology would finally emerge after centuries of dormancy. Quebec would change from its old fashioned roots and be brought into the progressive mainstream century.

A main difference was the secularization of the Catholic Church, practiced by most French Canadians from the province itself. Unlike in the 1950s under Duplessis, the church and state were now separate entities removing the strict control the old fashioned ways of the church had over institutions. The shift gained the province its own independence.

These ideologies took off after the victory of Jean Lesage's liberal party in the 1960 provincial election. The election of Jean Lesage and his liberal party finally ended the longstanding ancient regime the people of Quebec had been living under. It began the reinstitution of the outdated socioeconomic and political structures to fully modernize them once and for all. This movement would be known as the Quiet Revolution.

The Quiet Revolution signified something different for Quebeckers but a common denominator was that both English and French speakers were happy with the end to Maurice Duplessis's conservative party the Union Nationale that brought much social and political repression. The Quiet Revolution beginning in the 1960s gathered momentum with the many reformations carried out by Jean Lesage including changes to the education, social welfare, hospitalization, hydro-electricity, regional development and greater francophone participation in the industrial sector.

Quebec nationalism for the Francophones was on the rise at this time not only within the province but on a global scale as well. Quebec nationalism in the 1960s stemmed from the ideology of decolonization; this new type of nationalism was based on ideas happening on a global scale. Because of the new openness of the province, travelers and people of the church were encouraged to go and learn the ways of life in other parts of the world and then return to share, compare, and incorporate the ideologies into their lifestyle.

The oppression of Francophones was also something that Lesage wanted to bring to light and change because of the longstanding cultural and society tension between the Francophones and Anglophones. Lesage had the desire to change the role that the state had over the province. He no longer wanted economic inferiority of French Canadians and the Francophone society, but rather evolving organized labor, educational reform, and the modernization of political process.

There were many issues that the province had during this time due to the imbalance between the Francophones and Anglophones on a variety of levels. Even though the Francophones outnumbered the Anglophones, the Francophones were still seen as a minority. This oppression however dated further back than just the 1960s.

The province has a history of colonization and conquest that is complex and multi layered. The past history of this province can be seen in the city's landscape marked with a variety of memoir commemorating the overtaking powers.

The province's Francophones as well as ethnic and racial minority groups did not have any power, they were living in the poorest parts of cities. It was hard for these groups to progress in their careers or climb the socio-economic ladder. For Francophones it was difficult because success was geared towards the English speaker and prestigious institutions were English speaking and devalued the culture and language of the French.

By the early 1960s a group of French Canadians from all classes were receiving proper education but only to go into careers in Anglophone dominated institutions.

Avocation of the new form of nationalism was used to address the drastic conditions in the work place as well as living conditions. This was most apparent between the Francophones who believed in the new 1960s idea of nationalism and the predominantly English Canadian anti-nationalists. The goal of the new society was to overcome injustices for minority groups in everyday life. This sparked a number of movements such as the Black Power movement and Women's Rights Movement that were mainly seen in working-class neighbourhoods which gained publicity when journals, conferences and advocates fed into these movements.

A movement of a new Quebec with a new meaning behind the word Nationalism would continue to change and progress overtime with the 1960s being the start of this change.

Contemporary Quebec nationalism

Understanding contemporary Quebec nationalism is difficult considering the ongoing debates on the political status of the province and its complex public opinion. No political option (outright independence, sovereignty-association, constitutional reforms, or signing on to the present Canadian constitution) has achieved decisive majority support and contradictions remain within the Quebec polity.

One debated subject that has often made the news is whether contemporary Quebec nationalism is still "ethnic" or if it is "linguistic" or "territorial".

The notion of "territorial nationalism" (promoted by all Quebec premiers since Jean Lesage) gathers the support of the majority of the sovereigntists and essentially all Quebec federalist nationalists.

Ethnic nationalism 
Many people feel that Quebec nationalism and separatism is ethnic have often expressed their opinion that the sentiments of Quebec's nationalists are insular and parochial and concerned with preserving a  population of white francophones within the province. Despite these accusations being denounced by many Quebec nationalists who see both the separatist and nationalist movement as multi-ethnic, there is much evidence to suggest that both movements are based on ethnicity, rather than on territory. An example of this is when Premier of Quebec Jacques Parizeau, commenting on the failure of the 1995 Quebec referendum said "It is true, it is true that we were beaten, but in the end, by what? By money and ethnic votes, essentially." ("").
Another example of this was the implementation of Quebec's Bill 21, which sparked controversy after it banned people from wearing religious clothing in certain professions. This law hugely impacted the Muslim community in the province, with many citing it as proof of the movement's ethnic origins, and calling it Islamophobic, and discriminatory. Further controversy was sparked when most nationalist parties stated that the law was not Islamophobic, and instead stated that it was secular. Paul Plamondon, leader of the Parti Québécois (PQ) called someone in the Quebec government out for saying the law was "supremacist" while talking about systemic racism, which caused even more controversy and a backlash to the PQ by the Muslim community, and by the federalists.
Quebec nationalism and separatism being ethnically based was further evidenced when the PQ held a protest in Montreal on November 23, 2020, which called for the assimilation of immigrants, and for the strengthening on the French Language in the city. Less than 150 people turned out for the occasion, and by the PQ, as well as other nationalist and separatist parties refusing to acknowledge the existence of systemic racism in Quebec. The president of Quebec's human's rights commission, Philippe-André Tessier, a separatist, called the term systemic racism an "attack on the Quebec people".

There are many signs that point towards the nationalist and separatist movements being ethnically based.

There is little doubt that the post-1950s era witnessed an awakening of Quebecers' self-identity. The rural, conservative and Catholic Quebec of the 19th and early 20th centuries has given way to a confident, cosmopolitan society that has many attributes of a modern, internationally recognized community with a unique culture worth preserving.

The cultural character of Quebec nationalism has been affected by changes in the cultural identity of the province/nation more generally.  Since the 1960s, these changes have included the secularism and other traits associated with the Quiet Revolution.

Linguistic nationalism 

Another primary expression of nationalism in Quebec is the French language. People who feel that Quebec nationalism is linguistic have often expressed their opinion that Quebec nationalism includes a multi-ethnic or multicultural French-speaking majority (either as mother tongue or first language used in public). 

The entrenchment of the French language in Quebec has been a central goal of Quebec nationalism since the 1970s. In 1974, the Quebec Legislature passed the Official Language Act under Premier Robert Bourassa. This legislation made French the sole official language of Quebec and the primary language of services, commercial signing, labour relations and business, education, and legislation and justice. In 1977, this Official Language Act was superseded by the Charter of the French Language, which expanded and entrenched French within Quebec. This charter was passed by the first Parti Québécois government of Premier René Lévesque, and its goal was "to make French the language of Government and the Law, as well as the normal and everyday language of work, instruction, communication, commerce and business." 

After a 45-year hiatus in language legislation in Quebec, the provincial legislature passed An Act respecting French, the official and common language of Québec in 2022. This act greatly expanded the requirement to speak French in many public and private settings. The preliminary notes of the bill make its purpose clear: "the purpose of this bill is to affirm that the only official language of Québec is French. It also affirms that French is the common language of the Québec nation." This act amended the Charter of the French language and introduced "new fundamental language rights," such as reinforcing French as the language of legislation, justice, civil administration, professional orders, employers, commerce and business, and educational instruction. Premier François Legault and his Coalition Avenir Québec government justified this as necessary to preserve the French language that is central to Quebec nationalism.

Recognition of the nation by Ottawa 

On October 21, 2006, during the General Special Council of the Quebec wing of the Liberal Party of Canada initiated a national debate by adopting with more than 80% support a resolution calling on the Government of Canada to recognize the Quebec nation within Canada. On November 27, 2006, the House of Commons of Canada passed a motion recognizing that the "Québécois form a nation within a united Canada".

In 2021, François Legault's  government in Quebec proposed to amend the Charter of the French Language and the provincial constitution to more strongly entrench French as the sole official language. In response to this, the  initiated a motion in the House of Commons endorsing the constitutionality of Legault's initiatives and reasserting Quebecers' nationhood. The Commons passed the motion 281–2, with 36 abstentions.

Present-day nationalism 
Nationalism today is more open than what it was in the past in some ways. A common theme that can be seen is the attachment that  have towards their province, and the country of Canada. The majority of people in Quebec identify as both  and Canadian, and show great pride in celebrating both their province and their country on their respective days.

Nationalist groups

Political parties and groupings
 Bloc Québécois (1991–present)
 Coalition Avenir Québec (2012–present, The party's ideology is mostly nationalist but also promotes Quebec autonomism and some Canadian federalism)
 Option nationale (2012–2018, later fused with Québec Solidaire)
 OUI-Québec
 Parti Indépendantiste (2007–2014)
 Parti Québécois (1968–present)
 Québec debout (2018)
 Québec Solidaire (2006–present)
 Union Nationale (1936-1981, The party's ideology is half nationalist but also half Quebec autonomist)

Civic organizations
 Mouvement des Jeunes Souverainistes
 Mouvement national des Québécois
 Saint-Jean-Baptiste Societies

Academic and intellectual associations
 Centre étudiant de recherche et d'action nationale (CERAN) (Student research and national action centre)
 Institut de recherche sur l'autodétermination des peuples et les indépendances nationales (IRAI) (Research Institute on Self-Determination of Peoples and National Independence)
 Les Intellectuels pour la souveraineté (IPSO) (Intellectuals for Sovereignty)

Nationalists newspapers and publications
 L'Action nationale
 Le Devoir
 Le Jour
 Le Québécois

Extremist, nativist and ultra-nationalist groups
 Atalante 
 Fédération des Québécois de souche (Federation of native Québécois)
 La Meute (2015–present)
 Storm Alliance

Left-wing nationalist groups
 Front de libération du Québec (Quebec Liberation Front)

Nationalist Slogans
 *Québécois de souche ("old-stock Quebecker"): Quebecer who can trace their ancestry back to the regime of New France
Le Québec aux Québécois ("Quebec for Québécois", or "Quebec for Quebecers"): slogan sometimes chanted at Quebec nationalist rallies or protests. This slogan can be controversial, as it might be interpreted both as a call for a Quebec controlled by Québécois pure laine, with possible xenophobic connotations, or as a call for a Quebec controlled by the inhabitants of the province of Quebec, and free from outside interference.
 Maîtres chez nous ("Masters of our own house" a phrase coined by Le Devoir editor André Laurendeau, and was the electoral slogan of the Liberal Party during the 1962 election. 
Québécois pure laine: "true blue" or "dyed-in-the-wool" Quebecker

See also

1980 Quebec referendum
1995 Quebec referendum
Canadian nationalism
Clarity Act
French nationalism
History of Quebec
Lists of active separatist movements
Nationalism
Partition of Quebec
Politics of Canada
Politics of Quebec
Quebec federalist ideology
Quebec sovereignty movement
Quiet Revolution

Notes

References 

Claude Bélanger Quebec nationalism

In English

Books 
 Barreto, Amílcar Antonio (1998). Language, Elites, and the State. Nationalism in Puerto Rico and Quebec, Greenwood, 165 p. (excerpt)
 Berberoglu, Berch, ed., (1995). The National Question: Nationalism, Ethnic Conflict, and Self-Determination in the 20th Century, Temple University Press, 329 p. (excerpt)
 Buchanan, Allen. Secession: The Morality of Political Divorce from Fort Sumter to Lithuania and Quebec (1991) 
 Carens, Joseph H., ed. (1995), Is Quebec Nationalism Just?: Perspectives from Anglophone Canada, Montreal, McGill-Queen's University Press, 225 p. (excerpt)
 Clift, Dominique. Quebec nationalism in crisis (McGill-Queen's Press-MQUP, 1982).
 Cook, Ramsay (2003). Watching Quebec. Selected Essays, Montreal, McGill-Queen's Press, 225 p. (excerpt)
 Gagnon, Alain (2004). Québec. State and Society, Broadview Press, 500 p. (excerpt)
 Gougeon, Gilles. (1994). A History of Quebec Nationalism, Lorimer, 118 p. (except)
 Henderson, Ailsa (2007). Hierarchies of Belonging: National Identity and Political Culture in Scotland and Quebec, Montreal: McGill-Queen's University Press, 250 p.
 Keating, Michael (1996). Nations Against the State: The New Politics of Nationalism in Quebec, Catalonia, and Scotland, St. Martins Press, 260 p.
 Kymlicka, Will, and Kathryn Walker, eds. Rooted cosmopolitanism: Canada and the world (UBC Press, 2012).
 Mann, Susan (2002). The Dream of Nation: A Social and Intellectual History of Quebec, McGill-Queen's University Press; 2nd edition, 360 p. (excerpt)
 McEwen, Nicola (2006). Nationalism and the State: Welfare and Identity in Scotland and Quebec, Brussels: P.I.E.-Peter Lang, 212 p.
 Poliquin, Daniel (2001). In the Name of the Father: An Essay on Quebec nationalism, Vancouver: Douglas & McIntyre, 222 p.
 Requejo, Ferran. (2001). Democracy and National Pluralism, 182 p. (excerpt)
 Rioux, X. Hubert. Small Nations, High Ambitions: Economic Nationalism and Venture Capital in Quebec and Scotland (U of Toronto Press, 2020).
 Rivault, Fabrice & Hervé Rivet. (2008). "The Quebec Nation: From Informal Recognition to Enshrinement in the Constitution" in Reconquering Canada: Quebec Federalists Speak Up for Change, Edited by André Pratte, Douglas & McIntyre, Toronto, 344 p. (link)
 Seymour, Michel (2004). Fate of the Nation State, Montreal: McGill-Queen's Press, 432 p. (excerpt)
 Venne, Michel (2001). Vive Quebec! New Thinking and New Approaches to the Quebec Nation, James Toronto: Lorimer & Company, 221 p. (excerpt)

Newspapers and journals 
 Abelson, Donald, et al. "Millennial and Gen Z francophones don't value Quebec nationalism: In stark contrast to baby boomers who not only identify as Quebecers first but also believe the provincial government best represents their interests" Maclean's August 26, 2020
 Banting, Keith, and Will Kymlicka. "Canadian Multiculturalism: Global Anxieties and Local Debates." British Journal of Canadian Studies 23.1 (2010) online.
 Blanchet, Alexandre, and Mike Medeiros. "The secessionist spectre: the influence of authoritarianism, nativism and populism on support for Quebec independence." Nations and nationalism 25.3 (2019): 803-821.
 Brie, Evelyne, and Catherine Ouellet. "Exposure to English as a determinant of support for Quebec independence in the 2018 Quebec elections." French Politics (2020).
 Couture Gagnon, Alexandre, and Diane Saint-Pierre. "Identity, Nationalism, and Cultural and Linguistic Policies in Québec." Journal of Arts Management, Law, and Society 50.2 (2020): 115-130.
 Couture, Jocelyne, Kai Nielsen, and Michel Seymour (ed). "Rethinking Nationalism", in Canadian Journal of Philosophy, Supplementary Volume 22, 1996, 704 p.
 Ferland, Benjamin, and Luc Turgeon. "Understanding Majority Attitudes toward Minority Nations in Multinational Federations: The Case of Canada." Publius: The Journal of Federalism 50.2 (2020): 188-212.
 Gareau, Paul L. "The Army of Mary: Quebec Nationalism and Catholic Heterodoxy." in The Mystical Geography of Quebec (Palgrave Macmillan, Cham, 2020) pp. 55–83.
 Imbert, Patrick. "Francophones, Multiculturalism and Interculturalism in Canada, Quebec and Europe." in Citizenship and Belonging in France and North America (Palgrave Macmillan, Cham, 2020) pp. 33–53.
 Kymlicka, Will. "Being Canadian." Government and opposition 38.3 (2003): 357-385 online.
 Kymlicka, Will. "Canadian multiculturalism in historical and comparative perspective: Is Canada unique." Forum Constititionell 13#1 (2003): 1-8. online.
 Kymlicka, Will. "Multiculturalism and Citizenship-Building in Canada." CPRN Discussion Paper (2001): 47+ online.
 Kymlicka, Will. "Quebec: a modern, pluralist, distinct society", in Dissent, American Multiculturalism in the International Arena, Fall 1998, p. 73–79 (archived version)
 McGrane, David, and Loleen Berdahl. "Reconceptualizing Canadian Federal Political Culture: Examining Differences between Quebec and the Rest of Canada." Publius: The Journal of Federalism 50.1 (2020): 109-134 online.
 Rocher, François. "The Evolving Parameters of Quebec Nationalism", in JMS: International Journal on Multicultural Societies. 2002, vol. 4, no.1, pp. 74–96. UNESCO. (ISSN 1817-4574) 
 Rocher, François. "The Life and Death of an Issue: Canadian Political Science and Quebec Politics." Canadian Journal of Political Science 52.4 (2019): 631-655.(online)
 Venne, Michel. "Re-thinking the Quebec nation", in Policy Options, January–February 2000, pp. 53–60 (online)

In French

Books 
 Balthazar, Louis. "L'évolution du nationalisme québécois", in Le Québec en jeu, ed. Gérard Daigle and Guy Rocher, pp. 647 à 667, Montréal: Les Presses de l’Université de Montréal, 1992, 812 p.
 Bellavance, Marcel (2004). Le Québec au siècle des nationalités. Essai d’histoire comparée, Montréal: VLB, 250 p.
 Bock-Côté, Mathieu (2007). La dénationalisation tranquille : mémoire, identité et multiculturalisme dans le Québec postréférendaire, Montréal: Boréal, 211 p.
 Bock, Michel (2004). Quand la nation débordait les frontières. Les minorités françaises dans la pensée de Lionel Groulx, Montréal: Hurtubise HMH, 452 p.
 Bouchard, Catherine (2002). Les nations québécoises dans l'Action nationale : de la décolonisation à la mondialisation, Sainte-Foy: Presses de l'Université Laval, 146 p.
 Bouchard, Gérard (2004). La pensée impuissante : échecs et mythes nationaux canadiens-français, 1850–1960, Montréal: Boréal, 319 p.
 Bourque, Gilles (1996). L'identité fragmentée : nation et citoyenneté dans les débats constitutionnels canadiens, 1941–1992, Saint-Laurent: Fides, 383 p.
 Brière, Marc (2000). Point de départ! : essai sur la nation québécoise, Montréal : Hurtubise HMH, 222 p.
 Brière, Marc (2001). Le Québec, quel Québec? : dialogues avec Charles Taylor, Claude Ryan et quelques autres sur le libéralisme et le nationalisme québécois, Montréal: Stanké, 325 p.
 Denise Helly and Nicolas Van Schendel (2001). Appartenir au Québec : Citoyenneté, nation et société civile : Enquête à Montréal, 1995, Québec: Les Presses de l'Université Laval (editor)
 Diane, Lamoureux (2001). L'amère patrie : féminisme et nationalisme dans le Québec contemporain, Montréal: Éditions du Remue-ménage
 Gougeon, Gilles (1993). Histoire du nationalisme québécois. Entrevues avec sept spécialistes, Québec: VLB Éditeur
 Ignatieff, Michael (1993). Blood & belonging : journeys into the new nationalism, Toronto : Viking, 201 p.
 Keating, Michael (1997). Les défis du nationalisme moderne : Québec, Catalogne, Écosse, Montréal: Presses de l'Université de Montréal, 296 p.
 Lamonde, Yvan (2000). Histoire sociale des idées au Québec, 1760–1896, Montréal: Éditions Fides, 576 p. (online)
 Lamonde, Yvan (2004). Histoire sociale des idées au Québec, 1896–1929, Montréal: Éditions Fides, 336 p.
 Martel, Marcel (1997). Le deuil d'un pays imaginé : rêves, luttes et déroute du Canada français : les rapports entre le Québec et la francophonie canadienne, 1867–1975, Ottawa: Presses de l'Université d'Ottawa, 203 p.
 Monière, Denis (2001). Pour comprendre le nationalisme au Québec et ailleurs, Montréal: Presses de l'Université de Montréal 148 pé
 Montpetit, Édouard (2005). Réflexions sur la question nationale: Édouard Montpetit; textes choisis et présentés par Robert Leroux, Saint-Laurent: Bibliothèque québécoise, 181 p.
 Moreau, François (1995). Le Québec, une nation opprimée, Hull : Vents d'ouest, 181 p
 Paquin, Stéphane (2001). La revanche des petites nations : le Québec, l'Écosse et la Catalogne face à la mondialisation, Montréal: VLB, 219 p.
 Roy, Fernande (1993). Histoire des idéologies au Québec aux XIXe et XXe siècles, Montréal: Boréal, 128 p.
 Ryan, Pascale (2006). Penser la nation. La ligue d'action nationale 1917–1960, Montréal: Leméac, 324 p.
 Sarra-Bournet, Michel ed., (1998). Le pays de tous les Québécois. Diversité culturelle et souveraineté, Montréal: VLB Éditeur, 253 p.
 Sarra-Bournet, Michel ed., (2001). Les nationalismes au Québec, du XIXe au XXIe siècle, Québec: Presses de L’Université Laval, 2001
 Seymour, Michel (1999). La nation en question, L'Hexagone,
 Seymour, Michel, ed. (1999). Nationalité, citoyenneté et solidarité, Montréal: Liber, 508 p.
 Venne, Michel, ed., (2000). Penser la nation québécoise, Montréal: Québec Amérique, Collection Débats

Newspapers and journals 
 Beauchemin, Jacques. "Nationalisme québécois et crise du lien social", in Cahiers de recherche sociologique, n° 25, 1995, pp. 101–123. Montréal: Département de sociologie, UQAM.
 Courtois, Stéphane. "Habermas et la question du nationalisme : le cas du Québec", in Philosophiques, vol. 27, no 2, Autumn 2000
 Dufresne, Jacques. "La cartographie du génome nationaliste québécois", dans L'Agora, vol. 1, no. 10, July/August 1994.
 Gueydan-Lacroix, Saël. "Le nationalisme au Canada anglais : une réalité cachée", in L'Agora, April 10, 2003
 Kelly, Stéphane. "De la laine du pays de 1837, la pure et l'impure", in L'Encyclopédie de l'Agora, Cahiers d'histoire du Québec au XXe siècle, no 6, 1996
 Robitaille, Antoine. "La nation, pour quoi faire?", in Le Devoir, November 25, 2006
 Roy-Blais, Caroline. "La montée du pouvoir clérical après l’échec patriote", in Les Patriotes de 1837@1838, 2006-12-03
 Seymour, Michel. "Un nationalisme non fondé sur l'ethnicité", in Le Devoir, 26–27 April 1999
 Seymour, Michel. "Une nation peut-elle se donner la constitution de son choix?", in Philosophiques, Numero Special, Vol. 19, No. 2 (Autumn 1992)
 Unknown. "L'ultramontanisme", in Les Patriotes de 1837@1838, May 20, 2000

Further reading